Nura: Rise of the Yokai Clan, known in Japan as , is a manga series written and illustrated by Hiroshi Shiibashi. The series was first published in Shueisha as a oneshot in 2007. The manga has been continuously serialized in the Japanese manga anthology Weekly Shōnen Jump since March 2008 and has been collected into 25 tankōbon volumes as of December 2012.

Viz Media acquired the licensing rights for a North American release of the manga and anime adaptations.



Volumes list

References 

Nura: Rise of the Yokai Clan